John Grainger (1830, Belfast– 1891) was an Irish cleric and antiquarian.

Grainger was educated at Belfast Academy and Trinity College, Dublin. After gaining a Doctorate of Divinity he became Rector of Broughshane, County Antrim. He was an indiscriminating collector, who filled his house with a mass of often unlabelled specimens including stuffed birds, shells, insects, coins, minerals, a dolmen, weapons from New Zealand, and archaeological finds. According to Robert Lloyd Praeger his collection of Irish stone tools was ‘’especially valuable as a study in the gentle art of forgery’’.

Works
Partial list
 1853.Catalogue of the Shells found in the Alluvial Deposits of a Belfast site of the Irish Mesolithic. Proc. Roy. Irish Acad. 56 C, 1-195.
 --- Results of excavations in High St., Belfast. Ulster Journ. Arch. ix. 113-121.
 1874 On the Fossils of the Post-tertiary Deposits of Ireland. Rep. Bmt. Assoc, for 1874 ; Sections, pp. 73–76.

He was a member of the Royal Irish Academy and of the Belfast Natural History and Philosophical Society and the Belfast Naturalists' Field Club.

References
Praeger, R.Ll. 1949. Some Irish Naturalists, a Biographical Note-book.Dundalgan Press, Dundalk, 1949
Belfast Nat. Hist. and Phil. Soc. Centenary Volume, 77, portrait. 1924.
James, K.W.  1991. Canon Grainger: country rector, magpie collector and Father of the Ulster Museum.  Ulster Museum Publication No. 269.

Irish zoologists
Irish archaeologists
1830 births
1891 deaths